Mars Elliot Wright (born 1995) is an American clothing designer who owns an LGBTQ-themed fashion company.

Biography 
In 2017, Wright transitioned from female to male, moving to Los Angeles in order to do so safely. His Life on Mars clothing brand features LGBTQ-themed designs on t-shirts, face masks, hoodies, hats and tote bags. In 2007, Wright donated 25% of proceeds from clothing sales to Trans Lifeline, a charity which provides a crisis hotline for transgender people.

Wright uses multiple terms to describe his identity such as queer, transgender, transmasculine, and non-binary. Both of his parents are supportive of him being transgender. Wright has described experiencing childhood trauma as a result of growing up impoverished.

References

External links 
 Official Website

1995 births
Living people
American TikTokers
People from Flagstaff, Arizona
Northern Arizona University alumni